Dinah L. Moché (born 1936) was the author of several popular science books mainly dealing with Astronomy. She studied for a BA at Harvard University and a PhD at Columbia University. She worked for many years as a Professor of Physics & Astronomy, Queensborough Community College of the City University of New York.

Selected publications
 Moché, Dinah L. 2015. Astronomy: a self-teaching guide. 8th Edition,  Hoboken, N.J. : John Wiley & Sons.
 Moché, D. L. (1976). Development of Educational Materials to Recruit Women into Scientific Careers. American Journal of Physics, 44(4), 390–391.

References

1936 births
2018 deaths
American women astronomers
Columbia University alumni
Harvard College alumni
Queensborough Community College faculty